Rohit K. Dasgupta  is an academic in the School of Culture and Creative Arts at the University of Glasgow and a British Labour Party politician. Prior to this he was based at the Institute for Media and Creative Industries at Loughborough University. In 2018 he was elected Councillor in the London Borough of Newham for the Canning Town South Ward. He was re-elected for the same ward again in 2022  He contested the Parliamentary seat of East Hampshire for the Labour Party in 2017, coming second with an increase of 7% vote share. He is also Secretary of the Newham Branch of the Fabian Society. In 2019 he was selected as an MEP candidate for the South East region (5th on the list) but failed to get elected. Dasgupta is also a member of Labour's National Policy Forum and sits on the Work, Pensions and Equality Policy Commission.

Background
Dasgupta gained a BA degree in Comparative Literature from Jadavpur University, India, then graduated MA in English from the University of Westminster, PGCE from the University of West London, and PhD from the University of the Arts.

Political career
He was elected as a Labour and Co-operative party Councillor in the London Borough of Newham for the Canning Town South Ward in the 2018 United Kingdom Local elections. Following his election he was appointed Commissioner for Social Integration and Equalities in Newham since 2019 by the Mayor. He had previously contested the East Hampshire parliamentary seat in the General election, coming second with 17% of the vote share. Dasgupta is also the Chair of his local Labour party branch and Secretary of the Newham Fabian Society. He was one of the first Bengalis from West Bengal, India to contest the British Parliamentary elections. Dasgupta is also a member of BAME Labour, Labour Movement for Europe, Fabian Society, GMB and UCU. In 2018 he was elected on to the national committee of LGBT Labour. In 2019 he was selected as an MEP candidate for the South East region but failed to get elected. He has previously expressed his opposition to Brexit and support for a second referendum.

Academic career
Dasgupta is Senior Lecturer in Cultural Industries and Programme Convenor for Creative Industries and Cultural Policy at the University of Glasgow. He has previously worked at Loughborough University, Winchester School of Art, University of Southampton; University of the Arts London and University of Sussex . Dasgupta has authored and edited several books on media and digital culture, cinema, sexuality, gender, sexual health, anthropology and activism. He has also written for outlets such The Independent, The Conversation, Tribune Magazine, Left Foot Forward, Labour List and the Huffington Post. He has been involved in strike action against pension cuts, organising against homophobia and supporting inclusive relationship and sex education.

Electoral history

2017 General Election

2018 Local Election

2019 European Parliament election

2022 Local Election

Writing

Books
 (with Gokulsing, K.M., eds) (2014) Masculinity and its Challenges in India: Essays on Changing Perceptions , Jefferson, NC and London: McFarland and Co
 (with Datta, S. and Bakshi, K., eds) (2016) Rituparno Ghosh: Cinema, Gender and Art, New Delhi, New York & London: Taylor & Francis: Routledge
(2017) Digital Queer Cultures in India: Politics, Intimacies and Belonging, New Delhi, New York & London: Taylor & Francis: Routledge
(with Dhall, P. ) (2017) Social Media, Sexuality and Sexual Health Advocacy in Kolkata, India, New Delhi & London: Bloomsbury
(with Banerjie, N., Dasgupta, D., and Grant, J., eds) (2017) Friendship as Social Justice Activism: Critical Solidarities in a Global Perspective, Kolkata/London: Seagull Books and Chicago: University of Chicago Press
(with Dasgupta, D., eds) (2017) Queering Digital India: Activisms, Identities, Subjectivities, Edinburgh: Edinburgh University Press
 (with Begum, and L. Lewis., eds) (2018), Styling South Asian Youth Cultures: Fashion, Media and Society, London: Bloomsbury
 (with Datta, S) (2019) 100 Essential Indian Films, Lanham,MD and London: Rowman and Littlefield
 (with Bakshi, K) (2019) Queer Studies: Texts, Contexts, Praxis, Hyderabad: Orient Blackswan
 (with Banerjie, N and Boyce, P) (2022) COVID-19 Assemblages: Queer and Feminist Ethnographies from South Asia, London: Routledge

References

Academics of Loughborough University
Scholars from Kolkata
Labour Party (UK) people
Indian emigrants to England
Councillors in the London Borough of Newham
1987 births
Living people
Naturalised citizens of the United Kingdom
British politicians of Indian descent
English LGBT politicians
Fellows of the Royal Asiatic Society
Fellows of the Higher Education Academy